Abshurak (also Romanized as Ābshūrak and Āb Shūrk; also known as Ābsūreh) is a village in Isin Rural District, in the Central District of Bandar Abbas County, Hormozgan Province, Iran. At the 2006 census, its population was 2,056, in 451 families.

References 

Populated places in Bandar Abbas County